Dan Dineen (born 1997), also known as Dan Ó Duinnín, is an Irish Gaelic footballer. At club he plays with Cill an Martra and at inter-county level with the Cork senior football team. He usually lines out as a forward.

Honours

Colaiste Ghobnatan
All-Ireland Colleges Senior C Football Championship: 2014

Cill an Martra
Cork Intermediate Football Championship: 2018

Cork
Munster Under-21 Football Championship: 2016

References

External links
Daniel Dineen profile at the Cork GAA website

1997 births
Living people
Cill na Martra Gaelic footballers
CIT Gaelic footballers
Cork inter-county Gaelic footballers